Tofieldia pusilla is a species of flowering plant in the family Tofieldiaceae. It is also sometimes classified in the lily family, Liliaceae. Its common name is Scottish asphodel in Europe, and Scotch false asphodel in North America. The plant is native to northern North America and parts of Eurasia, its circumpolar distribution extending across Canada and the northern United States to Greenland, Iceland and northern Europe.

References

External links

Tofieldiaceae
Plants described in 1803